Ctenane dealbata is a moth of the family Nolidae. It was described by Wileman and West. It is found on the Philippines.

References

Nolidae
Moths of the Philippines